The men's +95 kg competition in judo at the 1984 Summer Olympics in Los Angeles was held on 10 August at the California State University. The gold medal was won by Hitoshi Saito of Japan.

Results

Pool A

Pool B

Repechages

Final

Final classification

References

External links
 

Judo at the 1984 Summer Olympics
Judo at the Summer Olympics Men's Heavyweight